Riolama inopinata is a species of lizard in the family Gymnophthalmidae. It is endemic to Venezuela.

References

Riolama
Reptiles of Venezuela
Endemic fauna of Venezuela
Reptiles described in 2015
Taxa named by Philippe J.R. Kok